SPIE SA, corporately styled Spie, is a French company specializing in the fields of electrical, mechanical and climatic engineering, energy and communication networks. Its business is the production, operation and maintenance assistance for industrial equipments. Spie is listed on the stock exchange with the code SPIE.

The company is located in Cergy-Pontoise, close to Paris.

References

External links

 

Construction and civil engineering companies of France
Cergy-Pontoise
Construction and civil engineering companies established in 1900
CAC Mid 60
Companies listed on Euronext Paris
French companies established in 1900